Fothergilla (witch alder) is a genus of two to four species of flowering plants in the family Hamamelidaceae, native to woodland and swamps of the southeastern United States.

The brush-like flowers are produced before the leaves in spring on terminal spikes; they do not have any petals, but a conspicuous cluster of white stamens 2–3 cm long. The leaves are alternate, broad ovoid, 4–10 cm long and 3–8 cm broad, with a coarsely toothed margin; they are noted for their brilliant orange or red fall colors.

Species

 Fothergilla gardenii dwarf witch alder
 †Fothergilla malloryi (Extinct, Ypresian, Klondike Mountain Formation)
 Fothergilla major large witch alder (incl. Fothergilla monticola)
 Fothergilla milleri
 Fothergilla parvifolia

Etymology

The genus was named in honor of the English physician and plant collector Dr. John Fothergill (1712-1780) of Stratford, Essex, who was known for introducing American plants to Britain.

Cultivation and uses
Fothergillas are grown as ornamental plants for their spring flowers and fall foliage color. They are slow-growing, rarely exceeding 1–2 m tall in cultivation. The hybrid cultivar Fothergilla × intermedia 'Mount Airy' has gained the Royal Horticultural Society's Award of Garden Merit.

References

External links
 Fothergilla major images at bioimages.vanderbilt.edu

Saxifragales genera
Hamamelidaceae
Flora of Alabama